Kalifa Traoré (born 16 February 1991) is a Malian professional footballer who plays as a centre-back for Championnat National 2 club Les Herbiers.

Club career
Traoré came through the youth ranks at Malian club JS Centre Salif Keita, joining in 2009 and spending two seasons at the club, before signing for French side Paris Saint-Germain in January 2011. He progressed through the ranks, and eventually signed a professional contract in 2012. Traoré later joined Ligue 2 side Sedan on loan until the end of the season.

In June 2014, Traoré joined Angers, another Ligue 2 team, signing a three-year contract.

International career
Kalifa Traoré has been capped at youth levels up to Mali U20 level.

References

External links
 
 
 

1991 births
Living people
Malian footballers
Malian expatriate footballers
Paris Saint-Germain F.C. players
CS Sedan Ardennes players
Angers SCO players
Les Herbiers VF players
Association football defenders
Championnat National 2 players
Championnat National 3 players
Ligue 2 players
Ligue 1 players
Championnat National players
Mali under-20 international footballers
Expatriate footballers in France
Sportspeople from Bamako
21st-century Malian people